Cults of Unreason is a non-fiction book on atypical belief systems, written by Christopher Riche Evans, who was a noted computer scientist and an experimental psychologist.  It was first published in the UK in 1973 by Harrap and in the United States in 1974 by Farrar, Straus and Giroux, in paperback in 1975, by Delacorte Press, and in German, by Rowohlt, in 1976.

Evans discusses Scientology and Dianetics, UFO religions, believers in Atlantis, biofeedback, Yoga, Eastern religions, and black boxes.  He points out that these systems and groups incorporate technological advances within a theological framework, and that part of their appeal is due to the failure of modern people to find strength, comfort, and community in traditional religion and in science.

In 2001 new religious movement specialist George Chryssides criticized the book's title by pointing out that most groups referred to as cults do have well-defined beliefs.

References

1973 non-fiction books
George G. Harrap and Co. books
Books critical of Scientology
Books about cults
1973 in religion